Porosporidae is a family of parasitic alveolates of the phylum Apicomplexia

Taxonomy

This family has 3 genera - Pachyporospora, Porospora and Nematopsis - and 37 species.

The members of this family are distinguished from the other septate gregarines by having a digenic (two host) life cycle.

History

This taxon was created in 1899 by Labbé.

Description

The species in this family are heteroxenous, meaning they live in two separate hosts during their life cycle. The two host species involved in their life cycle are a crustacean and a mollusc. The life cycle involves vegetative development in digestive tract of a decapod crustacean and sporogony in the connective tissue of a lamellibranch mollusc.

References

Apicomplexa families